Neolitsea fischeri is a species of plant in the family Lauraceae. It is a small tree endemic to the Anaimalai and Palni Hills in southern India.

The essential oils from the leaves, bark and fruits of Neolitsea fischeri have been characterized and shown to possess moderate to good activity against certain bacteria.

References

fischeri
Vulnerable plants
Endemic flora of India (region)
Flora of Kerala
Flora of Tamil Nadu
Taxonomy articles created by Polbot